in Tokyo, Japan) is a Japanese composer.

He graduated from the Musashino Academy of Music. He also finished a master's courses and graduated with the master of music. He then worked for two years in music research.

His work is varied and includes orchestral music, chamber music, choral music and music for traditional Japanese instruments. His compositions for winds, whose titles are self-descriptive, are kept in a dramatic musical language. Furthermore, he acts as a judge in competitions, as guest conductor with many orchestras and as the author of articles in professional journals ("The Flute", "The Clarinet", "The Sax"). He arranged in 2003 the theme of music (Music for planting and sowing by the Emperor and Empress of Japan) for the 54th National Arbor Day in Chiba Prefecture.

Works

Works for wind 
 1995 Celebres Overture
 1996 Dimelentas
 2000 Dimelentas II
 2001 March-Bou-Shu
 2001 The Lyric for Wind Orchestra "Appeals of autumnel winds"
 2002 Prelude
 2002 "Soaring over the Ridges" – the Impression of the North Alps
 2003 Flamboyant – Red Flames on the ground
 2003 A Tone poem for Wind Orchestra "And then the Ocean Glows"
 2003 Lemuria – The Lost Continent
 The Paradise of Greenery "Lemuria"
 Praising the Universe – The Fortress in the Drizzle
 The Civilization Going Down – The Peace to be handed down
 2003 Per-Sonare
 2004 Moai – the Seven Giant Statues Gazing at the Sun
 2004 The Scene of the Homeland – on theme by Edvard Grieg
 2004 Machu Picchu: City in the Sky - The mystery of the hidden Sun Temple
 2003/2004 The West Symphony
 The Blue Wolf on the Plateau
 Wahlstatt
 2005 Nazca Lines – The Universe Drawn on the Earth
 2005 Hymn to the Sun — with the Beat of the Mother Earth
 2005 Cavetowns "Cappadocia" – Strangely shaped rocks where elves dwell
 2005 Las Bolas Grandes
 Fanfare "Music City"
 2006 Sinfonia
 2008 On the Earth, Under the Sky
 2008 To Be Vivid Stars
 2009 The Bells of Sagrada Familia - the everlasting Will of Antoni Gaudi
 2010 Voyage – Flight into a Hopeful Future
2010 Like The Eagle, We Soar and Rise
 2011 Pompeii – The Ruins Know the Long and Magnificent History
2019 “Four Seasons of Japan”
2020 “Quarantine”
2020 “Aurora Dances”
2020 “Eternal Friendship”

Choir music 
 The Nightview of Lonesome

Chamber music
 2001 Intrada for brass octet (Trumpet 1, Trumpet 2, trumpet 3, Horn, Trombone 1(opt: Euphonium), Trombone 2, Trombone 3, Tuba)
 2002 Capriccio for Clarinet Octet (Eb Clarinet, 4 Bb Clarinet, Alto Clarinet, Bass Clarinet, Contrabass Clarinet)
 2003 Rhapsody for Euphonium Tuba Quartet (Euphonium 1, Euphonium 2, Tuba 1, Tuba 2)
 2004 Fioritura for Flute Quartet
 2005 Esmeralda for Euphonium Tuba Quartet (Euphonium 1, Euphonium 2, Tuba 1, Tuba 2)
 2006 Coloratura for Flute Quartet
 Arion's Harp for Saxophone Quartet (commissioned by the Arion Saxophone Quartet)

External links 
 Homepage for Satoshi Yagisawa

1975 births
Japanese classical composers
Japanese male classical composers
Living people
Musicians from Iwate Prefecture
Musicians from Tokyo
People from Iwate Prefecture